Shadigee Creek is a  tributary of Starrucca Creek in Wayne County, Pennsylvania in the United States. It is part of the Susquehanna River watershed, flowing to Chesapeake Bay.

Shadigee Creek joins Starrucca Creek just downstream of the borough of Starrucca.

See also
List of rivers of Pennsylvania

References

Rivers of Pennsylvania
Tributaries of the Susquehanna River
Rivers of Wayne County, Pennsylvania